The Frankfurt Group was a group of 19th Century musicians.

The Frankfurt Group may also refer to:

 The "Frankfurt group", a group of al-Qaeda-affiliated terrorists responsible for the Strasbourg Cathedral bombing plot in December 2000
 The Frankfurt Group, proposers of ISO 13490 CD-ROM file system
The Frankfurt group, involved in the Troubles at Frankfurt in the mid-1550s,